Europe-wide patent may refer to:
 Unitary patent, a European Union project to create a unitary patent in most EU member states
 European patents, granted by the European Patent Office under the European Patent Convention and enforced by national courts

See also
European patent law

European patent law